is a 2005 Japanese film written and directed by Dankan. It tells the story of seven families at a summer camp where the parents are involved in a very dark organ trafficking deal. The official English site states it to be based on true events.

External links
 
 

2005 films
2000s Japanese-language films
Films about dysfunctional families
Films about organized crime in Japan
Films about summer camps
2000s Japanese films